Youness Bengelloun (born 3 January 1983) is a French former footballer who played as a defender. He is currently a scout at Manchester City.

Career
Born in Paris, Bengelloun has played in France, Switzerland, Spain, Greece, Cyprus and Bulgaria for Paris Saint-Germain B, Amiens, Neuchâtel Xamax, Alavés, Raon-l'Étape, Istres, Panserraikos, Olympiakos Nicosia, Lokomotiv Plovdiv, CSKA Sofia and Mulhouse.

In June 2009 he trialled with Scottish club Hibernian.

On 21 August 2014, Bengelloun was drafted by Goa to play in the Indian Super League.

After retiring from football, Bengelloun was appointed as a scout by English side Manchester City in July 2017.

References

1983 births
Living people
French footballers
French expatriate footballers
Association football defenders
Footballers from Paris
Paris Saint-Germain F.C. players
Amiens SC players
Neuchâtel Xamax FCS players
Deportivo Alavés players
US Raon-l'Étape players
FC Istres players
Panserraikos F.C. players
Olympiakos Nicosia players
PFC Lokomotiv Plovdiv players
PFC CSKA Sofia players
FC Mulhouse players
FC Goa players
RWS Bruxelles players
Manchester City F.C. non-playing staff
Ligue 2 players
First Professional Football League (Bulgaria) players
Indian Super League players
Cypriot Second Division players
Challenger Pro League players
French expatriate sportspeople in Switzerland
Expatriate footballers in Switzerland
French expatriate sportspeople in Spain
Expatriate footballers in Spain
French expatriate sportspeople in Greece
Expatriate footballers in Greece
French expatriate sportspeople in Cyprus
Expatriate footballers in Cyprus
French expatriate sportspeople in Bulgaria
Expatriate footballers in Bulgaria
French expatriate sportspeople in India
Expatriate footballers in India
French expatriate sportspeople in Belgium
Expatriate footballers in Belgium
Association football scouts